The Bonin grosbeak or Bonin Islands grosbeak (Carpodacus ferreorostris) is an extinct finch. It is one of the diverse bird taxa that are vernacularly called "grosbeaks", but it is not closely related to the grosbeaks sensu stricto. Many authorities place the species in the genus Carpodacus, but some place it in its own genus, Chaunoproctus. A 2013 genetic analysis found it to be a relatively basal member of the group, more derived than the common rosefinch, but with no close relatives, with an estimated divergence time from other members of the group around 12.5 million years ago.

Behaviour
 
It was a retiring although not shy bird, and was usually found singly or in pairs. It fed on fruits and buds which were primarily picked up from the ground or low shrubs; it rarely was observed to perch in trees, being apparently rather phlegmatic and somewhat reluctant to fly. Only one kind of vocalization has been described: a soft, pure and high note, sometimes short, sometimes drawn out; sometimes given singly, sometimes in a short series.

Habitat
It was found only on Chichi-jima in the Ogasawara Islands. While reports that it was also found on Haha-jima are almost certainly erroneous, it might have occurred on Anijima and Otōtojima. Chichi-jima is the only place, however, where the bird was observed. Several specimens were taken; some 10 remain at present. Contemporary illustrations show considerable differences, especially in males. Whether these are due to seasonal variation or whether several subspecies or even species existed could only be determined by a thorough review of the available material.

Extinction
 
The Bonin grosbeak was discovered by the Beechey Pacific expedition, which collected two specimens on Chichi-jima in 1827. The following year, Kittlitz took several more specimens, but he only gave the locality "Boninsima" (="Bonin-shima": Ogasawara Islands). Following the report of two shipwrecked sailors, picked up by Beechey, that the island would make a good stopover station for whalers, settlement was begun in 1830. 
When the Rodgers-Ringgold North Pacific Exploring and Surveying Expedition called at Chichi-jima in 1854, naturalist William Stimpson could not find the birds. What he did find, however, were rats and feral goats, sheep, dogs and cats, in addition to the pigs that were already present in 1828 (and which might have been left there by Beechey to provision future castaways). Just like the Bonin thrush, the Bonin grosbeak probably succumbed soon after 1830 to habitat destruction and predation by the introduced mammals.

The collector A. P. Holst was told by settlers on Chichi-jima in 1889 that some birds had persisted on Haha-jima until the early 1880s. However, given that the species was not reported from there neither during the 1853 visit of the first Perry mission to Japan nor in 1854, this seems either erroneous or a misunderstanding for some other island in the Chichi-jima group. The sedentary habits of the Bonin grosbeak make it unlikely that it was present anywhere outside the Chichijima Rettō.

References

Further reading

 Bonaparte, Charles Lucien Jules Laurent (1850): 1060. Chaunoproctus. In: Conspectus generum avium 1: 526. PDF fulltext available at Gallica: search for "Bonaparte" and "Conspectus" 
 Vigors, Nicholas Aylward (1829): [Description of Chaunoproctus ferreorostris]. Zool. J. 4: 354. 

Carpodacus
Endemic birds of Japan
Extinct animals of Japan
Extinct birds of Oceania
Natural history of the Bonin Islands
Bird extinctions since 1500
Bonin grosbeak
Articles containing video clips